Loyiso Mdashe (born 4 June 1989) is a South African cricketer. He made his first-class debut for Border in the Sunfoil 3-Day Cup on 19 February 2015. In September 2017, he was named in Free State's squad for the 2017 Africa T20 Cup. He made his List A debut for Free State in the 2017–18 CSA Provincial One-Day Challenge on 15 October 2017.

In September 2018, he was named in Free State's squad for the 2018 Africa T20 Cup.

References

External links
 

1989 births
Living people
South African cricketers
Border cricketers
Free State cricketers
Place of birth missing (living people)